The Tsunami Projekt was a one-off music compilation CD which was created in early 2005, specifically to aid the people devastated by the Tsunami that struck Asia in December 2004. This "CD Project as Benefit" was conceived and created by the online community of progressive music fans and artists at the Spock's Beard website forum. A short run of the resulting double CD was financed solely by members of the board, and sold out almost immediately. 100% of the proceeds (just over $10,000.00) was donated to benefit the victims of the Tsunami.

Along with the many (relatively unknown) artists from all over the world who contributed to the album, a few famous progressive rockers donated submissions as well - Neal Morse (formerly of Spock's Beard) and Nick D'Virgilio (of Spock's Beard) each contributed demo tracks, and bands IZZ, IQ and Din Within all have a track on the album, and Ajalon had a song that featured keyboard solos by Rick Wakeman, best known for his work with Yes. 

The project was originally the brainchild of Barry Thompson (known on the forum as KirksNoseHair); much of the technical work was handled by Brian Cobb (a.k.a. Brians Split Personality) - he also managed the financial end of producing the album and collecting the money for donation to the Tsunami charity. The artwork for the CD was designed by Martin Kornick (a.k.a. Man In The Mountain), and the liner notes were contributed by Darren Burns (a.k.a. CageNY).

The Artists

Disc 1 

What If... - Split Personality - USA
Eleven - Theory of Everything, now known as The Third Ending - Australia
Looking For Answers - NDV (Nick D'Virgilio) - USA
The Wait of It All - Gary Sauer and Holly Anderson - USA
Tears of Babylon - Mark McCrite and Don Schiff - USA
Ancient - Nullstadt - USA
Hold A Candle - Singularity - USA
Schylla & Charybdis - Abracadabra - Estonia
With The World Away - IZZ - USA
Hope (for Amy Renee) - Radharc - USA
The Tower - The Lock - USA
Driving Home - Mellotrön - DETROIT, MI, USA
Hey You - Din Within - USA
To Be Continued... - ptM - USA

Disc 2 

Episode of Fact - Wooden Badger - USA
What Kind of Love - Ajalon (with Rick Wakeman) - USA
Tell Me Annabelle - Neal Morse - USA
The Mean Green Sea - Jim Harrel - USA
Lost In Paradise - IQ - UK
Another Day - Schafe im Elektrozaun - Germany
Done & Gone - Bonzo - Germany
Fly Away - Open Your Eyes, Nicholas (a.k.a. Chris Harrison) - UK
Udu Dances - Doctor J - USA
Remain The Same - Radiant Split - UK
Never Forget - The Marshall-Gray Project - USA
I Lost - HyeKevan (with Jimmy Keegan) - USA
On The Outside - Obscenery - USA
Be The Heroes - Lee Abraham - UK

2005 compilation albums
Charity albums